Cliffjumper is the name of several fictional  characters from the Transformers franchise. His name is usually associated with an Autobot whose toys are often red repaints or remold of Bumblebee toys.

Transformers: Generation 1 

Cliffjumper's bio indicates that he compensates for his small size by being the first to rush into any dangerous situation, desiring only to beat up "Decepti-creeps." Although this trait has his fellow Autobots' respect, occasionally it ensnares him into situations he cannot handle. His motto is "Let me at 'em!" 

Cliffjumper's weapon is his glass gas gun, which fires a gas that turns metal as brittle as glass for a short time. In the episode "Fire In the Sky," he mentions his gun has a "defrost cycle" to melt ice.

According to original tech spec notes written by Bob Budiansky found at Iacon One in 2006 the original name for Cliffjumper was Blow-Out, a name later used for a Generation 2 Autobot.

Hasbro registered the name Cliffjumper for U.S. Trademark in October 2003.

Animated series 
In The Transformers animated series, Cliffjumper was part of the original Autobot crew of the Ark. When the Autobots and Decepticons were reawakened, Cliffjumper was given the alternate mode of an Earth car. He and Hound were sent to scout out the location of the Decepticons. Although ordered not to engage the Decepticons, Cliffjumper took the opportunity to try to shoot Megatron, revealing their existence to the Decepticons. Because of this, Hound was blown off the road by Laserbeak – something that made Cliffjumper regret his impulsiveness. Hound, however, did not blame him, quipping that he was only sorry he missed.

Cliffjumper's bravery was often a boon to the Autobots – as well as a problem. In the episode "Changing Gears", Cliffjumper's rash actions helped the Autobots get past a Decepticon force field and stop their Solar Needle device from destroying the sun. However, Cliffjumper survived the blast but he ended up having a temporary concussion which he was able to recover quickly.

In the episode "Traitor", Cliffjumper overeacted & developed a belief that Mirage had sold them out to the Decepticons after missing a Decepticon power plant while on patrol. Cliffjumper followed Mirage, who was devising a scheme to prove he was not a traitor by setting the Decepticons and Insecticons, who were in a feud, against each other. However, Cliffjumper misinterpreted his actions. Reporting back to base, Cliffjumper told Optimus Prime what he saw and then believed he must be stopped but Prime decided to go back to the power plant to stop the Decepticons then find Mirage so they can hear his side of the story with Ratchet accompanying them. Once they got to the power plant, Cliffjumper, Optimus Prime and Ratchet saw no one there until Mirage, who's been implanted by one of Bombshell's cerebro-shells, shows up as he explains to them that he was setting up the two factions of Decepticons against each other. However, Cliffjumper doesn't believe Mirage's story. Being led into an ambush by the Decepticons and Insecticons, Cliffjumper knocks Mirage unconscious. Listening in on what Optimus Prime and Ratchet, who removed the cerebro-shell that was controlling Mirage, were saying when they sum as to why Mirage set them up, Cliffjumper realizes that Mirage didn't betray the Autobots, was telling him the truth about setting up the Decepticons as well as not seeing them while he was on patrol. Cliffjumper finish the battle, but retreated when Megatron destroyed his own power plant. After returning to base, Cliffjumper apologized to Mirage for not believing him and making him go through so much trouble.

In "Starscream's Brigade", Cliffjumper and Jazz were invited as guest of honor for an unveiling of a statue for their leader Prime but were under attack when Starscream showed up, after he broke off from Megatron, along with his newly created Combaticons. During the scuffle, Cliffjumper suggested to Jazz into calling headquarters for help but were captured before they can make the call, as Starscream wanted their Energy absorber for the Combaticons. Cliffjumper with Jazz were chained up at a water and power plant but they did get rescued by the other Autobots when they found their location.

During The Transformers: The Movie, Cliffjumper, with Jazz again is stationed on Moonbase 1, from which try unsuccessfully to escape when attacked by Unicron. After their apparent consumption by the planet-eater, they are ultimately saved by Daniel Witwicky. Despite living through the movie, in season 3 Cliffjumper was reduced to a background character, an unforeseen result of voice actor Casey Kasem's objection to the portrayal of Arab characters as stereotypical villains and eventual departure from the show. His last appearance in the original U.S. cartoon was in "Five Faces of Darkness, Part 1", the first episode of the third season.

Books 
Cliffjumper appeared in the following books:
The 1984 sticker and story book Return to Cybertron written by Suzanne Weyn and published by Marvel Books.
The 1984 sticker and story book The Revenge of the Decepticons written by Suzanne Weyn and published by Marvel Books.
The 1985 audio adventure Laserbeak's Fury. In this story's accompanying book Cliffjumper was depicted in his yellow variant, not his usual red one.
He was a main character in the 1985 story Sun Raid, where he was described as a "red truck."

Comics

Devil's Due Publishing 
Cliffjumper reappeared in the third G.I. Joe vs. the Transformers crossover series from Devil's Due Publishing as part of the combined Autobot/G.I. Joe force trying to rescue Optimus Prime.

Dreamwave Productions 
When civil war broke out on the planet Cybertron between the Autobots and Decepticons, Cliffjumper joined the Autobot cause.
When Decepticon Military Operations Commander Shockwave led a force of Decepticons against the Autobot capitol of Iacon, Cliffjumper was among the Autobots who defended the capitol (Transformers: War Within #3).

When Decepticon leader Megatron and Autobot leader Optimus Prime disappeared in an accident with a space bridge, the Autobot and Decepticon forces splintered into smaller factions. Cliffjumper stayed with the Autobots under the leadership of Prowl. Learning that the Decepticons were testing a new mobile command base at the Praetorus Wharf, Prowl led Cliffjumper, Gears, Jazz, Skids and Sideswipe to investigate. What they discovered was Trypticon. The giant Decepticon easily routed them, and Prowl's team were only saved by Shockwave's calling him away to battle against the Fallen and Chaos Trinity. (Transformers: The War Within - The Dark Ages #3).

Six million years ago, Ultra Magnus united the Autobot factions and lead them to victory over Decepticons and Ultracons. Megatron returned to Cybertron in command of the clone forces of the Aerospace Extermination Squadron and took over Cybertron. Cliffjumper was among the Autobots enslaved and forced to labor tunneling into Cybertron's core (Transformers: War Within - The Age of Wrath #2). Eventually Optimus Prime returned to Cybertron and helped free the enslaved Autobots.

Cliffjumper was among the Autobots who followed Optimus Prime on his mission on board the Ark and crash landed on Earth.
In 1984, when the Ark's computer re-activated, it reformatted Cliffjumper as in the form of an Earth car. Eventually the combined forces of the Autobots on Earth, and their human allies were able to capture the Decepticons. A ship called the Ark II was built to take the Cybertronians back to Cybertron, along with some human companions, but the ship exploded shortly after takeoff. The human allies were killed, but the Cybertronians were lost in the ocean, again in stasis lock.

Cliffjumper traveled to Cybertron along with Optimus Prime and a number of Autobots when arrested by Ultra Magnus.

Bumblebee was placed in command of the Autobot supply shuttle Orion, with Powerglide, Warpath, Seaspray, Cosmos, Cliffjumper, Bumper and the Powerdashers assigned to him. Their mission was to aid the Autobots on Earth. Upon arriving in the Earth system from transwarp space, they witnessed the arrival of Sunstorm (Transformers: Generation One III #1). After Omega Supreme was damaged in the fight with Sunstorm, Cliffjumper was reluctantly assigned the duty of protecting him until he recovered. Dreamwave would go out of business at this point, preventing any further tales of Cliffjumper from being told.

Fun Publications 
The Classics storyline by Fun Publications is set in a sequel to the Marvel Comics story, ignoring the events of the U.K. and Generation 2 comics. It is revealed that Cliffjumper had been in stasis since the attack by the Underbase powered Starscream in the Marvel Comics story, and was only recently revitalized on Cybertron. Optimus Prime then returns to Earth commanding a small groups of Autobots including Cliffjumper when they learn Megatron has returned.

In Crossing Over the mysterious Skyfall allies himself with the Autobots as they investigate a strange energy reading in South America. Cliffjumper is assigned to watch over Skyfall by Optimus Prime. Skyfall, Cliffjumper and the Decepticon Landquake arrive in an underground energon pool together and meet the Autobot Breakaway, who is guarding the pool, but has little memory of why. Together Breakaway, Landquake and Skyfall feel they are somehow connected. Cliffjumper refuses to leave Skyfall as they are sent through a dimensional portal by Breakaway's Caretaker computer to find their "fourth".

In the Transformers: Timelines story "Shattered Glass" Cliffjumper is separated in dimensional transit and ends up by himself on a mirror universe Cybertron where the tyrant Optimus Prime and his evil Autobots are opposed by Megatron and the heroic Decepticons. After being shot by Optimus Prime for being a traitor, he is recovered by the Decepticons and joins their cause. He and his glass gas is key to the destruction of the launch pad to the Ark - a space ship the Autobots plan to use to conquer Earth.

Cliffjumper appears in the fiction Dungeons & Dinobots, a text based story. He defends the Arch-Ayr fuel dump with the Decepticons from an Autobot attack. He later captures the Dinobots Slugfest and Goryu for the Decepticons to reprogram as Dinocons. Cliffjumper, Sideswipe, Blurr and Rodimus then track Grimlock through a maze of traps and discover the Omega Terminus. A trap separates him with Sideswipe, leaving him to survive with Rodimus. Cliffjumper refuses to be part of Rodimus' plan to use the Terminus to create an army to take over Cybertron. After a run-in with Grimlock and zombified versions of Cliffjumper's evil counterpart and Sideswipe's old commander Drench, they escape the maze.

Cliffjumper appears in the story Do Over. When Megatron is captured by the Autobot Targetmasters led by Ricochet, it is Cliffjumper who warns Starscream not to send a large force to rescue him, but instead send a small group of Micromasters. He is among the crew of the Nemesis, which follows the Autobot's Ark to Earth before being shot down by human defenses.

Cliffjumper appears in Eye in the Sky. After meeting the Decepticons new human allies Cliffjumper warns that the Autobots probably survived the crash to Earth. He helps recover the stasis pod of Crasher and gets her back online. Cliffjumper, Crasher, Frenzy, Heatwave, Ravage and Soundwave are sent on a mission to Burpleson Air Force Base to stop the Autobots from controlling the Global Orbital Defense System. Heatwave uses his powers to convince the GODS transmitter to fire the weapon on itself and stop the Autobots from taking control.

Cliffjumper appears in Reunification having returned to Cybertron where he was reunited with Landquake, Skyfall and Breakaway just before Cyclonus attempts to kill Megatron at the command of Alpha Trion.

IDW Publishing 
Cliffjumper made his first IDW Publishing appearance in issue #3 of The Transformers: Megatron Origin, mourning Bumper alongside Bumblebee and Hubcap.

When he next appears in Spotlight: Cliffjumper, he successfully engages an entire platoon of Decepticons single handed.

Marvel Comics 
Events specific to the Marvel U.K. Transformers comics are in italics.

Cliffjumper appears in the Marvel Comics Transformers comic, where his role is much the same as in the animated series. The earlier comic stories feature Cliffjumper prominently, deploying his 'glass gas' gun against unfortunate Decepticons.

Cliffjumper works with Windcharger and Gears on the Dinobot Hunt, charged with bringing in the mentally incapacitated Dinobot Sludge. Unfortunately the party were victims of an ambush set up by Soundwave.

Cliffjumper returns in "Totaled!" to fight alongside hundreds of Autobots against the faction of Decepticons led by Ratbat on the moon and was one of the many casualties of the battle.

Cliffjumper briefly appears in the Marvel UK future timeline in the story "Wanted: Galvatron - Dead or Alive" where he takes part in an ambush of a group of Decepticons on Cybertron.

Games
Cliffjumper is one of eight playable characters in the 1986 Commodore 64 video game Transformers: The Battle to Save the Earth.

Toys 
Generation 1 Mini-Car Cliffjumper (1984)
One of the retroactively-called 'Pre-Transformer' toys, the Cliffjumper mold was originally designed and released in 1983 in Japan by Takara as part of the Micro Change subset of their Microman line. The toy was designated simply `1981 'Porsche 924' (MC-01). Its "stubby" vehicle mode proportions were designed to resemble Takara's Choro-Q toyline (Penny Racers in the US). Following Hasbro's licensing of Takara toys for sale in the US, 'Cliffjumper' was released with the first wave of Transformers in 1984. A second side effect of the use of Takara overstock was that of a similar MicroChange mold (MC-02 Mazda Familia 1500 XG in yellow) being placed on Cliffjumper packaging. This toy was sometimes also found on Bumblebee cards, leading to fans referring to the character as Bumblejumper (BUMBLEbee + cliffJUMPER). The name was later officially shortened by Transformer fiction to Bumper.  Cliffjumper was later remolded into the Series 3 mini-bot Hubcap.
In 1985 a special Listen 'N Fun edition of Cliffjumper was sold that included a cassette with the audio story Sun Raid.
Cliffjumper was released under a number of names in different countries (Carrera in Mexico, Cliff in Japan, Matamore in Canada, Grillo in Italy,  Sziklaugró in Hungary, etc) and was available in a variety of additional colors including blue, green, orange, white, gold, and silver.

Generation 1 Mini-Car Yellow Cliffjumper (1984)
Owing to Hasbro using leftover toy stock bought from the Microman line, some Cliffjumper toys were yellow (its alternate MicroChange color) instead of red.

Generation 1 McDonald's Cliffjumper (1985)
One of the four original McDonald's Happy Meal Transformers toy from 1985, this toy was just a solid blue statue of the character in robot mode.

Generation 1 Keychain Cliffjumper
Cliffjumper was reissued (with the addition of a keychain attachment) in his traditional red. This mold was later recolored into the convention-exclusive Transformers: Universe Tap-Out figure.

Generation 1 Black Keychain Cliffjumper
A variant all-black color was blind packaged in Japan.

Classics Deluxe Cliffjumper (2007)
A red redeco of the Classics Deluxe Bumblebee figure. he does not come with a gun, despite being described as having one in his tech specs. Instead, he has the same accessory as Bumblebee - a waverider jet pack.
The mold for this figure was also used for the BotCon exclusive Decepticon Bugbite.

Titanium 3 inch Cliffjumper (unreleased)
Cliffjumper, a redeco of Bumblebee, was to be released as a 3-inch non-transforming figure in the Transformers: Titanium line in early 2007. This version of Cliffjumper does carry a gun.

Titanium 6 inch War Within Cliffjumper (unreleased)
A prototype of a 6-inch-tall War Within Bumblebee/Cliffjumper figure was seen at a Hasbro factor tour in 2007. This figure had two different head sculpts, one for Bumblebee and one for Cliffjumper. This figure has yet to be released and seems to have been canceled.

Henkei! Henkei! Legends Cliff (2008)
A redeco of the Universe Legends Bumblebee toy available only in Japan by Takara Tomy, bundled with Brawn and Beachcomber as part of the "Mini-Bot Attack Team."

Alternity Cliffjumper (2009)
A Deluxe-sized figure with intricate detail and articulation that transforms into a Suzuki Swift. The body design is also shared with Bumblebee, which is colored yellow and uses a different head sculpt.

 Generations Deluxe Cliffjumper (2012)
An Asia market re-release of the Prime First Edition Deluxe figure with a different head sculpt that closely resembles G1 Cliffjumper's face.

 War For Cybertron: Earthrise Deluxe Cliffjumper (2020)
This new Cliffjumper toy is based on his G1 cartoon appearance and was released as part of the first wave of  the War For Cybertron: Earthrise deluxe figures. He is a legends class size figure that comes with ski-boards and 2 guns that form his long gun that he had in the cartoon.

Transformers: Armada 

The name Cliffjumper was given to a female Mini-Con in Transformers: Armada. She does not appear in any cartoon or comic-book series, although she did receive a biography in the Dreamwave More Than Meets The Eye comics.

Cliffjumper's bio described her as almost the polar opposite of the Generation 1 Cliffjumper - where he was brash and always ready to fight, she is quiet and reserved, seeking an end to the war so she can return to her scientific career. Sadly for her, she was stuck with Cheetor, her polar opposite, as a partner. A cocky type always seeking adventure, he often teased her about her name, unaware of the damage it did to her self-esteem. After he was taken as one of Unicron's four horsemen, she felt slightly relieved - almost immediately feeling guilty at the mere thought of it.

Toys 
Armada Cheetor with Cliffjumper (2002)
A recolor of Ransack, Cliffjumper is a female Mini-Con that comes with Armada Cheetor.

Transformers: Energon 

The name Cliffjumper (Overdrive in Japan) was used again in the Transformers: Energon line.

In the Transformers: Energon animated series, Cliffjumper's name was frequently swapped with fellow Autobot Downshift, as they were originally mistaken for one another when they first appeared. His vehicle mode was a dune racer.

This Cliffjumper is more reminiscent of the original, as he is described as loving high-risk situations, although not the battle fervour of the original. Cliffjumper loves stunt driving, with the more risk and speed involved the better. While he is a skilled warrior, his unnecessary risk-taking has earned him more than one reprimand from Optimus Prime.

Animated series 
Cliffjumper appeared in the Transformers: Energon series as one of the inexperienced soldiers under the command of Bulkhead sent into the rift caused by the collision of Unicron's head with his body. They eventually succeeded in bringing Optimus Prime's team back to the normal universe. In the final battle, he gave his spark energy to empower Optimus Supreme against the Unicron-possessed Galvatron.

Dreamwave Productions 
Cliffjumper also appeared in the accompanying Energon comics by Dreamwave Productions. He originally came to Earth to battle the Terrorcons, and became part of the Autobot forces permanently stationed there.

Later, he was knocked out by a surprise attack from Tidal Wave, who further threatened his life to get Ironhide to do what he wanted.

He was part of the Autobot forces in Los Angeles, battling against the horde of Insecticon clones - until they were surprisingly bailed out by Megatron. Dreamwave's closure prevented this story from ever being completed.

Toys 
Energon Cliffjumper (2004)
The toy of Energon Cliffjumper was recolored into Energon Beachcomber.

Transformers Cinematic Universe

Cliffjumper is the name of a character from the 2007 Transformers movie toy line.

Cliffjumper is impatient and is considered the opposite of the composed Autobot Bumblebee. He'd rather take down a Decepticon by force and then try to get information from their smoldering wreckage than spy on them.

The Legends 2-pack with Cliffjumper and Recon Barricade says that Cliffjumper and Barricade are old rivals. Cliffjumper often taunts Barricade into making mistakes. Most of the time his taunts lead to victory.

Live-Action Films
Cliffjumper appears in the film Bumblebee as a lieutenant of the Autobot Resistance. He is first seen during the Fall of Cybertron before escaping with the other Autobots. Later in the film, he is interrogated by Decepticons Shatter and Dropkick on one of Saturn’s moons, intending to find out the whereabouts of Optimus Prime, to which Cliffjumper refuses to reveal. However, the two decepticons pick up Bumblebee’s Signal, which Charlie had inadvertently activated by turning a key. Realising that interrogating Cliffjumper would lead to no success, the two Decepticons left, but not before bisecting the Autobot, killing him. He would later be avenged by Bumblebee, who tears Dropkick apart with a chain and crushes Shatter in a flood.

IDW Publishing 
In Transformers: Defiance #1 by IDW Publishing, back on ancient Cybertron, Bumblebee and Cliffjumper were tasked to watch over the All Spark at the temple at Simfur. In issue #3, Megatron learns that Optimus Prime has broken into his room so he sends Bumblebee, Camshaft, Cliffjumper, Jazz, Prowl and Smokescreen to arrest Optimus for treason. Optimus demands to speak directly to Megatron, but when the group is traveling to Megatron's location, they are ambushed by Barricade, Brawl, Crankcase, Frenzy, Starscream, Skywarp and Thundercracker - who have orders to kill the lot of them. Smokescreen is able to cover Optimus and his group's retreat in the confusion of an explosion. In issue #4 Arcee, Bumbelbee, Cliffjumper, Jazz and Smokescreen ambush Ironhide, who they believed works for Megatron, but Ironhide instead joins Optimus Prime's Autobots.

Cliffjumper is among the Autobot forces who witness the launching of the Decepticon ship Nemesis.

In Transformers: The Reign of Starscream, the Decepticon Starscream barely makes it to the Nemesis on Mars before he runs out of power. His return is noted by the Autobot Cosmos, who alerts Arcee, Cliffjumper, Smokescreen, Camshaft and Air Raid. Aided by Thundercracker on the Nemesis, Starscream recovers and sends the information on the Allspark Frenzy had gathered back to Cybertron just as Hardtop spots the Autobots closing on the Nemesis. In issue #3, Cliffjumper is shot in the back by Starscream.

Unlike the other Autobots who were clearly shown to have been killed, Cliffjumper's status was ambiguous in the actual fiction. Chris Mowry says he survived, however. John Barber sneakily alluded to it years later for "Convergence".

Toys
All toys of this character are officially licensed from General Motors.

Transformers 3D Battle Card Game Cliffjumper (2007)
Cliffjumper is among the characters which appeared in the 1st wave of Transformers 3D Battle Card Game by Wizards of the Coast. Unlike most versions of Cliffjumper for the movie, where he is a red repaint of movie 2007 Bumblebee. The Cliffjumper card looks nearly identical to Alternators Swerve, with the addition of 2007 movie style exposed facial robotics and joints. His vehicle mode is a Chevrolet Corvette C6. Oddly, a Swerve card was released, which was a red redeco of Bumblebee - leading some to think their cards were swapped.

Transformers Legends Class Cliffjumper (2007)
A red repaint of Legends Bumblebee, which transforms into a Classic Camaro. Available in a 2-pack with Movie Legends Recon Barricade. The car mode is at 1/64 scale.

Transformers Cyber Slammers Cliffjumper (2007)
A red repaint of movie Concept Camaro Bumblebee.

Transformers Deluxe Class Cliffjumper (2008)
A red repaint of Concept Camaro Bumblebee. This Deluxe toy features Automorph technology and a complex transformation. Comes with a laser cannon that opens to become a clear blue blade. This toy is about 14 centimeters long in vehicle mode. With a real Concept Camaro being 473 centimeters long this toy has a scale of about 1/34. With the toy standing 16 centimeters tall in robot mode, the real robot would stand about 18 feet tall. Curiously, the toy has been misprinted on promotional images: it depicts Cliffjumper with splodges of All Spark blue on his thighs, when there is none there. Also, it has something similar to Bumblebee: the front end of his feet are black; however, there is no black. Like Megatron, the promo images have errors overall.

Bumblebee Speed Series Cliffjumper (2018)
A red repaint of Speed Series Bumblebee (Volkswagen Beetle).

Non-transforming merchandise 
Transformers Robot Heroes Movie Cliffjumper (2007)
A Robot Heroes Movie Bumblebee repaint as a Best Buy exclusive with "Battle Attack Optimus Prime".

Revenge of the Fallen Titanium 3-inch Cliffjumper vs. Dead End (2009)
A Toys "R" Us store exclusive gift set featuring redecos of the Bumblebee and Jazz figurines.

Transformers Animated 

Because of his temper, Cliffjumper has never been much of a spy. Even though he works in Intelligence, he does not interact much with the enemy. Instead, he collects information from field agents and finds the important bits for his superiors. Of course, knowing everything there is to know about the Decepticons makes him a little tense, which is why he's always ready for a fight.

Animated series 
In the Transformers Animated episode "Autoboot Camp", an Autobot similar in appearance to Bumblebee, but taller, and with longer horns and a red and gray color scheme, is featured. Although not named, series artist Derrick J. Wyatt confirmed that the character is Cliffjumper.

He makes a reappearance in the season 3 opener, "Transwarped", where he gets to speak. He speaks when telling Longarm Prime/Shockwave that, per Ultra Magnus's orders, the Space Bridge Nexus is to be shut down due to the Decepticons trying to transwarp to Cybertron. He then appears outside Longarm/Shockwave's office, told by Longarm to dispose of a cube that was once Blurr, being told it was "sensitive materials."

Cliffjumper appeared again in "Five Servos of Doom" where he is contacted by Optimus Prime, Sentinel Prime, Jetfire, and Jetstorm. He told the Earth bound Autobots that about "50 megacycles ago, Ultra Magnus was attacked by the Decepticon traitor Shockwave." He then goes on to say that Ultra Magnus is "... in recovery, but Shockwave got away with his Magnus hammer and did a number on the communications systems." He then gets told that Prowl has captured many of Megatron's top soldiers. He later appears alongside Alpha Trion and Preceptor in a transmission to Sentinel Prime concerning the laters return to Cybertron. Cliffjumper taunts Sentinel by saying that "he thought it was Prowl" when Sentinel attempts to take credit for capturing Megatron's soldiers. He was also seen in "Endgame Part 2" when Optimus Prime and his team captured Megatron, Shockwave, and Lugnut.

Other media
Cliffjumper appears among the characters in Re-Unification, the 2010 TFCon voice actor play prelude comic.

Toys 
Animated Activators Cliffjumper (2009)
A red redeco of Activators Bumblebee in red with a new head sculpt. Features instant transformation at a press of the police light on the roof.

Animated TA-10 Activators Cliffjumper (Takara Tomy) (2010)
The 2010 Japanese release by Takara Tomy is virtually identical to the Hasbro version, with the exception of a red Autobot emblem.

Transformers: Timelines (Shattered Glass)

This Cliffjumper is the counterpart of Generation 1 Cliffjumper in the Shattered Glass mirror-universe storyline. He is blue instead of red, and well as being evil like the Autobots in this timeline. His friends described him as being overly trusting. He died before the Generation 1 Cliffjumper arrived on his world, and G1 Cliffjumper was mistaken for his counterpart until the truth became known.

Fun Publications
In "Dungeons & Dinobots", the Omega Terminus reanimates the dead body of Cliffjumper and uses it as a weapon against the other Cliffjumper and his Decepticon companions. The undead Cliffjumper is destroyed by Scraplets, who devour dead metal.

Transformers: Prime

Cliffjumper appeared in the 2010 computer animated series Transformers: Prime. His Earth form is a red first-generation Dodge Challenger decorated with bull horns on the hood. Unlike the previous versions of Cliffjumper he is not a recolor of Bumblebee, however he was in the War for/Fall of Cybertron video games, however in the animated series when the Autobots change into Earth-based vehicles their appearance changes completely except for Cliffjumper, whose Cybertronian robot mode remained when he was a Dodge Challenger for unknown reasons.

Animated series
Cliffjumper first appears in the first two episodes of the Transformers: Prime 5-part mini-series Darkness Rising. Outside of Jasper, Nevada, Cliffjumper tells Arcee how he got a boot from human police officers for being parked illegally, and scared the officers by kicking it off and driving by. He soon discovers a deposit of Energon and is attacked by Vehicons, destroying the Energon during the one-sided fight before being captured. He is taken before Starscream, who fatally stabs the Autobot in the chest when Cliffjumper asks where Starscream's master is. Cliffjumper's lifeless body is later used by Megatron to test the Dark Energon he obtained, reanimating the Autobot into a mindless beast before being sliced in half and later falling to his death.

In "Predatory", Airachnid mentioned to Arcee the deaths of Cliffjumper and Tailgate, whom were both her partners and suggested Arcee was the reason they died. Also Cliffjumper is seen in one of the flashback's rescuing Arcee with Bumblebee as they saved her from Airachnid on Cybertron. In "Partners", Arcee discovers that it was Starscream who killed Cliffjumper, and attempts to take revenge by forcing Starscream into a fight despite his surrender. In "Stronger, Faster", Cliffjumper was mentioned by Ratchet, as he blamed Optimus's beliefs in protecting humanity for causing Cliffjumper's demise, infuriating Arcee.

In "Out of the Past," a flashback showed that Cliffjumper and Arcee had been captured by Starscream in his plot to force them into decoding a cryptic Autobot message at the time when Arcee didn't know Cliffjumper. Upon being imprisoned, Cliffjumper is asked by Arcee about how he got captured. Cliffjumper states that he intercepted some Decepticon message where Starscream was delivering Energon to Shockwave. In order to get the encryption from Arcee and Cliffjumper, Starscream brings them to Kaon to let Shockwave extract it from them. When Shockwave plans to dispose of Cliffjumper, Starscream tells Shockwave the Cliffjumper is his. Shockwave acknowledges Starscream's orders and leaves. Before Starscream can finish off Cliffjumper, Arcee breaks free and frees Cliffjumper while trapping Starscream. Arcee and Cliffjumper learn from Starscream that Shockwave is using the Energon to build a Space Bridge. While heading towards Shockwave, Cliffjumper tells Arcee that he knows what Airachnid did to Tailgate. Arcee and Cliffjumper take out two Vehicon guards at the Space Bridge where the Decepticons can use the Space Bridge to get to Earth before Autobot reinforcements can arrive. Cliffjumper distracts two more Vehicons while Arcee sabotages the Space Bridge. After knocking out Shockwave, Arcee and Cliffjumper are attacked. Arcee and Cliffjumper escape into the Space Bridge before it explodes. When Shockwave tries to follow them, Arcee manages to shoot Shockwave in the head as Arcee and Cliffjumper successfully arrive on Earth. Before leaving to find Optimus Prime, Arcee and Cliffjumper are left wondering if Shockwave survived the Space Bridge's explosion.

Books
Cliffjumper appears in the short story Bumblebee at Tyger Pax By Alex Irvine.

Cliffjumper appears in the novel Transformers: Exodus.

Comics

IDW Publishing
Cliffjumper is one of the Autobots featured in the Transformers: Prime trade paperback by IDW Publishing, which leads into the animated series.

Games
Cliffjumper appears in the 2010 video game Transformers: War for Cybertron. He is a red redeco of Bumblebee and unique to the Nintendo DS version of the game.

Cliffjumper appears again in Transformers: Fall of Cybertron. He is playable in Chapter 4 of the game. In this chapter Cliffjumper and Jazz explore the Sea of Rust looking for Grimlock. He has the special ability to turn invisible. This level is also the first time he fights elite guards.

He appears in Transformers: Rise of the Dark Spark in the Cybertron levels. He is a playable character.

Toys
 Generations Deluxe Cliffjumper (2010)
A red redeco of Generations Bumblebee, sporting a different head sculpt.

 United UN03 Deluxe Cliffjumper Cybertron Mode (2010)
The Japanese version of the Generations figure by Takara Tomy is in a metallic repaint.

 Prime Cyberverse Legion Cliffjumper (2012)
A new Cyberverse Legion mold of Cliffjumper.

 Prime First Edition Deluxe Cliffjumper (2012)
A new mold of Cliffjumper from the Prime series, with flip out blasters from the wrists.

 Prime First Edition Deluxe Cliffjumper (Takara Tomy) (2011)
The Japanese version of Prime First Edition Cliffjumper by Takara Tomy in a metallic repaint.

 Prime Robots in Disguise Revealers Deluxe Cliffjumper (2012)
A different sculpt of Prime Deluxe Cliffjumper that is smaller than the First Edition release. Comes with a blaster that doubles as a hammer.

 Prime Deluxe Terrorcon Cliffjumper (2012)
A slight redeco of the Prime First Edition Deluxe figure, depicting Cliffjumper's undead form with a broken horn and Dark Energon 'scratches'.

See also
Lists of Transformers characters

References

Comics characters introduced in 1984
Fictional characters with superhuman strength
Male characters in animated series
Transformers characters
Volkswagen Beetle